OSDN (formerly SourceForge.JP) is a web-based collaborative development environment for open-source software projects. It provides source code repositories and web hosting services. With features similar to SourceForge, it acts as a centralized location for open-source software developers.

The OSDN repository hosts more than 5,000 projects and more than 50,000 registered users. Registered software used to be mostly specialized for Japanese use, such as input method systems, fonts, and so on, but there are popular applications like Cabos, TeraTerm, and Shiira. Also, since the renewal of the brand name to OSDN, more and more projects that used to be developed on SourceForge are moving to OSDN, such as MinGW, TortoiseSVN, Android-x86, and Clonezilla.

History 
SourceForge.JP was started by VA Linux Systems (latterly SourceForge, Inc.) and its subsidiary VA Linux Systems Japan on April 18, 2002. OSDN K.K. spun off of VA Linux Systems Japan in August 2007. As of June 2009, OSDN K.K. was operating the SourceForge.JP.

On May 11, 2015, the site was renamed from "SourceForge.JP" to "OSDN". In the same month that OSDN changed the site name, SourceForge caused two controversies: DevShare adware and project hijacking. In contrast, OSDN totally refuses adware bundling and project hijacking. For that reason, the changing of the site name to OSDN is perceived to have been done based on criticism of and adverse reactions to SourceForge's monetization.

Features 
OSDN provides revision control systems such as CVS, SVN, Git, Mercurial, and every feature in SourceForge. What makes OSDN different from SourceForge is the bug tracking system and the wiki system. On OSDN, these are very Trac-like systems.

See also 
 Comparison of source code hosting facilities

References

External links 

 

Free software websites
Geeknet
Internet properties established in 2002
Open-source software hosting facilities